Horatio was a  naval trawler, launched on 8 August 1940. She served in World War II as a minesweeper and was sunk by the German motor torpedo boat S-58 off Cap de Garde, near Bône, Algeria. Two crew members survived the sinking and were captured by the German navy.

Description
They were generally armed with a 12-pounder  quick firing low angle gun and three 20mm Oerlikons in single mountings.

History
Horatio was ordered on 12 December 1939. She was built by Cook, Welton & Gemmell, of Beverley. Her keel was laid on 12 March 1940 and she was launched on 8 August 1940.

Horatio was commissioned on 17 January 1941, carrying the pennant number T153. Temporary Acting Lieutenant Commander Charles Robertson took command on 24 January, but apparently was killed in an accident only four days later. Command was taken up by Acting Lieutenant Commander Henry Silvester Warren, on 20 February 1941. Around April of the same year, Horatio received a new commanding officer, Temporary Lieutenant Charles Alfred Lemkey, who was to remain the trawler's captain for remainder of its career. 

The trawler took part in a number of convoys during World War II.

On 7 July 1942, Leading Seaman William Harold Leon Simpson RNPS was awarded the Distinguished Service Medal for "courage and steadfastness in beating off an attack on H.M.T. Horatio by two groups of three enemy aircraft,destroying one aircraft and seriously damaging another."

On 7 January 1943 Horatio was sunk by the German motor torpedo boat S-58 off Cap de Garde, near Bône, Algeria. Two crew members survived the sinking and were captured by the German navy. The full list of 32 sailors lost in the sinking of Horatio was published in the Times on 24 November 1943.

References

 

Shakespearian-class trawlers
Ships built on the Humber
1940 ships
World War II patrol vessels of the United Kingdom
Merchant ships of the United Kingdom
Steamships of the United Kingdom